Agostinho Neto is a settlement in Lobata District on São Tomé Island in São Tomé and Príncipe. Its population is 992 (2012 census). It lies 1.5 km southeast of Guadalupe and 2.5 km west of Conde.

After São Tomé and Príncipe became independent in 1975, the settlement was named after the founding father of Angola, Agostinho Neto. The settlement grew around the plantation complex Roça Rio do Ouro, established in 1865. It is one of the most impressive agricultural structures in the country. There is a museum in the former mansion.

Population history

Sports
The football (soccer) club of the village is Amador.

References

Populated places in Lobata District